This article is about the particular significance of the year 1734 to Wales and its people.

Incumbents
Lord Lieutenant of North Wales (Lord Lieutenant of Anglesey, Caernarvonshire, Flintshire, Merionethshire, Montgomeryshire) – George Cholmondeley, 3rd Earl of Cholmondeley 
Lord Lieutenant of Glamorgan – Charles Powlett, 3rd Duke of Bolton
Lord Lieutenant of Brecknockshire and Lord Lieutenant of Monmouthshire – Thomas Morgan
Lord Lieutenant of Cardiganshire – John Vaughan, 2nd Viscount Lisburne
Lord Lieutenant of Carmarthenshire – vacant until 1755
Lord Lieutenant of Denbighshire – Sir Robert Salusbury Cotton, 3rd Baronet 
Lord Lieutenant of Pembrokeshire – Sir Arthur Owen, 3rd Baronet
Lord Lieutenant of Radnorshire – James Brydges, 1st Duke of Chandos

Bishop of Bangor – Thomas Sherlock (until 8 November); Charles Cecil (from 15 January)
Bishop of Llandaff – John Harris 
Bishop of St Asaph – Thomas Tanner
Bishop of St Davids – Nicholas Clagett

Events

March - In a report to the Society for the Propagation of the Gospel, missionary Griffith Hughes claims to have travelled over 1,100 miles in the Pennsylvania region in the course of his preaching.
30 March - First entry in the diary of William Bulkeley.
date unknown 
Original construction (in stone) of Cilewent Farmhouse, now located at St Fagans National History Museum.
Daniel Rowland marries Eleanor Davies of Caer-llugest and is ordained a deacon.

Arts and literature

New books

English language
Edmund Curll - The Life of Robert Price … one of the Justices of His Majesty's Court of Common-Pleas

Welsh language
Simon Thomas - Athrawiaethau Difinyddawl

Births
20 January - Robert Morris, Welsh-born American merchant (died 1806)
15 April - Evan Lloyd, poet (died 1776)
3 July - Henry Herbert, 10th Earl of Pembroke (died 1794)
24 October - Thomas Henry, apothecary (died 1816)

Deaths
14 June 
Francis Gwyn, politician, 85
John Hanbury, industrialist, 70?
13 July - Ellis Wynne, clergyman and writer, 63
October - Thomas Lloyd, lexicographer, 61?
26 December - Salusbury Lloyd, politician, 
date unknown - Elisha Beadles, South Wales-based Quaker leader, 74?

References

1734 by country
1734 in Great Britain